Carlo Francesco, Duke of Aosta (Carlo Francesco Maria Augusto; 1 December 1738 – 25 March 1745) was a prince of Savoy. He was born in the reign of his father Charles Emmanuel III, King of Sardinia.

Biography 
Prince Carlo was born at the Palace of Venaria, Turin. He was the first child of his father Charles Emmanuel III of Sardinia and  Élisabeth Thérèse of Lorraine. His mother died giving birth to his brother Prince Benedetto, named after Pope Benedict XIV who became pope the year before his birth.

At the time of his birth, he was third in line to the Sardinian throne after his father and his oldest half brother Victor Amadeus, Duke of Savoy. His paternal cousins included Louis XV of France, the future Ferdinand VI of Spain and the Prince of Carignan. His maternal cousin's included the future Queen of Naples and the famous Marie Antoinette.

He died in Turin aged 7, and was buried at Royal Basilica of Superga, Turin.

Ancestry

References 

1738 births
1745 deaths
Nobility from Turin
Princes of Savoy
Burials at the Basilica of Superga
Dukes of Aosta
Royalty and nobility who died as children
Sons of kings